Krasnaya Sludka is a rural locality (a selo) in Dobryansky District, Perm Krai, Russia. The population was 50 as of 2010. There are 36  streets.

Geography 
Krasnaya Sludka is located 46 km south of Dobryanka (the district's administrative centre) by road. Yelniki is the nearest rural locality.

References 

Rural localities in Dobryansky District